Prosimulium is a genus of black flies (insects in the family Simuliidae). There are at least 110 described species in Prosimulium.

See also
 List of Prosimulium species

References

Further reading

External links

 

Simuliidae
Chironomoidea genera